Labyrinthomyces is a genus of truffles in the Tuberaceae family. The genus, circumscribed by Karel Bernard Boedijn in 1939, contains   seven species found in Australia.

References

External links
 

Pezizales
Truffles (fungi)
Pezizales genera
Taxa named by Karel Bernard Boedijn